Niskayuna station is a historic railway station located at Niskayuna in Schenectady County, New York.  It was possibly built in 1843 by the Schenectady and Troy Railroad and renovated or replaced in the 1880s.  It is a one-story, rectangular, red brick masonry building on a foundation of rough cut quarry stone. It has a gable roof with broad eaves that cover the platform area.  The rear wall of the station is situated directly upon the current, steep bank of the Mohawk River.  It ceased to be used as a railroad facility in 1964, then was converted to a single family residence.  It has been acquired by the town of Niskayuna as part of the Mohawk Hudson Hike/Bike Trail along the former railroad bed.

It was listed on the National Register of Historic Places in 2007 as Niskayuna Railroad Station.

References

Railway stations on the National Register of Historic Places in New York (state)
Transportation buildings and structures in Schenectady County, New York
Railway stations in the United States opened in 1843
Former New York Central Railroad stations
Railway stations closed in 1964
1843 establishments in New York (state)
National Register of Historic Places in Schenectady County, New York